Luis Miguel Castillo (born December 12, 1992) is a Dominican professional baseball pitcher for the Seattle Mariners of Major League Baseball (MLB). He made his MLB debut in 2017 with the Cincinnati Reds. Castillo is a two-time All-Star.

Professional career

San Francisco Giants
Castillo signed with the San Francisco Giants as an international free agent in December 2011. He made his professional debut in 2012 with the DSL Giants and spent the whole season there, going 1–3 with a 3.31 ERA in 54.1 relief innings pitched. In 2013, he returned there, going 0–1 with a 0.64 ERA in 27 relief appearances, and in 2014, he played for the Augusta GreenJackets where he pitched to a 2–2 record and 3.07 ERA in 48 relief appearances.

Miami Marlins
On December 20, 2014, Castillo along with Kendry Flores were traded to the Miami Marlins for Casey McGehee. He spent 2015 with the Greensboro Grasshoppers and was promoted to the Jupiter Hammerheads in July. In 35 games (16 starts) between the two teams, he was 6–6 with a 3.20 ERA.

Castillo began 2016 with Jupiter and was promoted to the Jacksonville Suns during the season. On July 29, 2016, the Marlins traded Castillo along with Jarred Cosart, Josh Naylor and Carter Capps to the San Diego Padres for Andrew Cashner, Colin Rea and Tayron Guerrero. He was returned to Marlins after Rea suffered an injury in his first start and was returned to the Padres. The Marlins added him to their 40-man roster after the season. In 26 games (24 starts) between Jupiter and Jacksonville, he was 8–6 with a 2.26 ERA.

Cincinnati Reds
On January 19, 2017, the Marlins traded Castillo, Austin Brice, and Isaiah White to the Cincinnati Reds for Dan Straily. He began 2017 with the Pensacola Blue Wahoos.

On June 23, 2017, the Reds promoted Castillo, who made his MLB debut, against the Washington Nationals. In 14 starts for Pensacola prior to his call-up he compiled a 4–4 record and 2.58 ERA. Castillo spent the remainder of the season with the Reds after his promotion, going 3–7 with a 3.12 ERA in 15 starts. He began 2018 in Cincinnati's starting rotation. In 31 starts for the Reds, he posted a record of 10–12 with an ERA of 4.30 in  innings.

On March 19, 2019, Castillo was named the Reds' starter for Opening Day on March 28 against the Pittsburgh Pirates. During the season, he posted a 15–8 record with a 3.40 ERA and 226 strikeouts and was named to his first All-Star Game.

In 2020, Castillo pitched to a 4–6 record and a 3.21 ERA with 89 strikeouts in 70.0 innings of work.

In 2021, Castillo recorded a 3.98 ERA with 192 strikeouts in  innings over 33 starts. He tied for the MLB lead in losses (16) and led the NL with 75 walks. He had the highest ground ball percentage of all major league pitchers, at 56.6%.

On March 22, 2022, Castillo signed a $7.35 million contract with the Reds, avoiding salary arbitration.

Seattle Mariners
On July 29, 2022, the Reds traded Castillo to the Seattle Mariners in exchange for minor league prospects Noelvi Marte, Edwin Arroyo, Andrew Moore and Levi Stoudt. On September 24, 2022, the Mariners signed Castillo to a five-year, $108 million contract with a sixth-year option.

Castillo pitched to a 3.19 ERA in 11 starts through the rest of 2022. He helped the Mariners end their 21-year playoff drought. In Game 1 of the 2022 American League Wild Card Series, he threw 7.1 scoreless innings, striking out 5, allowing zero walks, and 6 hits on the way to a 4-0 Mariners win.  It was the first 7+ inning scoreless start in Mariners postseason history.

Pitching style
Like his idol, Pedro Martínez, Castillo is a low 3/4 pitcher, but features one of the top changeups in the Major Leagues, to go along with an upper 90s mph fastball and a slider. According to Statcast, he uses four-seam fastballs and sliders against left-handers, while using 2-seamers and changeups against right-handers, as strikeout pitches.

References

External links

1992 births
Living people
Augusta GreenJackets players
Cincinnati Reds players
Dominican Republic expatriate baseball players in the United States
Dominican Summer League Giants players
Greensboro Grasshoppers players
Jacksonville Suns players
Jupiter Hammerheads players
Major League Baseball pitchers
Major League Baseball players from the Dominican Republic
National League All-Stars
Pensacola Blue Wahoos players
People from Baní
Seattle Mariners players